Albino Giovanni Gomes (born 7 February 1994) is an Indian professional footballer who plays as a goalkeeper for I-League club Churchill Brothers.

Club career

Early life and youth career 
Born in Goa, India, Albino began playing football at the age of 12. He played as a striker but later became a goalkeeper due to his height advantage. Albino began his youth career in Sporting Clube de Goa before moving to Salgaocar.

Salgaocar
Gomes was promoted to the Salgaocar first-team in before the 2012–13 season. He was included in the squad and was benched in the I-League match against Shillong Lajong on 9 February 2013.

Mumbai City
On 10 July 2015, during the 2015 Indian Super League draft, Gomes was picked by Mumbai City FC as their final pick in the draft. He made his professional debut for the club during their opening game of the season against Pune City on 5 October 2015. He started and played the whole match but conceded three goals as Mumbai City fell 3–1.

Aizawl FC
In 2016, Gomes was signed by Aizawl F.C for the 2016-17 I-League season. He was a crucial part of the team, as he won the I-League with Aizawl FC in the 2016-17 season and was also awarded with the best goalkeeper of the season. He was called up for the India national team after the season.

Delhi Dynamos

Injury and hiatus
Gomes' performance in the I-League prompted Delhi Dynamos to buy him in the 2017-18 ISL Players Draft. He made his debut for the Dynamos against Pune City on 22 November 2017. He later went on to play for the club in the next three games. Unfortunately he later suffered back-to-back injuries and went into a hiatus for almost three seasons.

Odisha FC 
Albino was included in the squad of renamed Delhi Dynamos FC, Odisha FC for the 2019-20 Indian Super League season, but was left out of every match due to his injury that occurred during the pre-season.

Kerala Blasters
On 8 June 2020, Albino signed for Kerala Blasters. He made his debut for Kerala Blasters against the newly formed ATK Mohun Bagan which ended 1–0 in the favor of ATK Mohun Bagan. On the match against Chennaiyin FC on 29 November 2020, Albino played a pivotal role in securing a point for Kerala Blasters by saving a penalty and saving several shots from the opposition thereby claiming the Man of the Match award and finishing the match with a clean-sheet. The match ended 0–0. During the match against Mumbai City Albino saved a penalty in the 78th minute becoming the only goalkeeper to save 3 penalties in a single Indian Super League season since 2015. Albino assisted for the first time in his career for the goal scored by Jordan Murray against SC East Bengal on 15 January 2021 which ended in a 1-1 draw. Thus he became the first Indian goalkeeper and second in overall goalkeepers to have an assist in Indian Super League, second to former Delhi Dynamos goalkeeper, Toni Doblas.

He was named in the Blasters squad for the 2021 Durand Cup, and made two appearances in the tournament. He played his first match of the 2021–22 Indian Super League season against ATK Mohun Bagan in the season opener on 19 November 2021, which they lost 4–2. On 5 December, Albino sustained an injury to his previously operated knee in a match against Odisha FC. He was substituted in 73rd minute of the game. The Blasters later confirmed that he has been ruled out for an indefinite period of time.

International career
Gomes was selected by Stephen Constantine for the India U23 side that took part in the 2016 AFC U23 qualifiers. Albino was called up for the national team on several occasion but was left out on the bench.

Personal life 
Albino idolised Gianluigi Buffon and former Indian international and current Hyderabad FC goalkeeper Subrata Pal.

Career statistics

Honours

Club

Aizawl 
 I-League: 2016–17

Kerala Blasters 

 Indian Super League runner up: 2021–22.

References

External links 
 Albino Gomes at Indian Super League

1994 births
Living people
Indian footballers
Salgaocar FC players
Mumbai City FC players
Aizawl FC players
Association football goalkeepers
Footballers from Goa
I-League players
Indian Super League players
Kerala Blasters FC players
Sporting Clube de Goa players
Odisha FC players